Scène De Cirque (circa 1970) is an oil on canvas painting by Belarusian-French artist Marc Chagall.

Description 
The canvas features acrobats, trapeze artists and clowns. The subject of circus was dear to the artist. Chagall often returned to the circus as a subject matter in his artworks. He considered clowns, acrobats and actors as tragically human beings who are like characters in certain religious paintings. Among other Post-Impressionist and Modern painters who featured the circus in their works are Georges Seurat, Henri de Toulouse-Lautrec, Pablo Picasso, Georges Rouault, Kees van Dongen, and Fernand Léger.

Provenance 
The painting has been estate of the artist till 1998 when it was sold to private collector. In 2017 it was acquired by a private American collector at Sotheby's.

Exhibitions 

 Reykjavik, National Gallery of Iceland, The Reykjavik Arts Festival, 1998

See also
List of artworks by Marc Chagall

References

1970 paintings
Paintings by Marc Chagall
Clowns in art